Caesarism is an authoritarian or autocratic ideology inspired by Julius Caesar. It has been used in various ways by both proponents and opponents as a pejorative.

Historical use of the term 
The first documented use of the word is in the 19th century when it was used by German historian Johann Friedrich Böhmer in 1846 to describe the state subordinating the Church to its control. In 1850 it was used again by Auguste Romieu, who defined Caesarism as the rule of military warlords. Sociologist Peter Baehr writes "following Romieu's polemic "Caesarism"...[Caesarism] gained vogue status". In 1857 religious writer Orestes Brownson used it to mean monarchical absolutism. In 1858 the Westminster Review wrote "clumsy eulogies of Caesarism as incarnate in the dynasty of Bonaparte".

The most famous person who himself espoused Caesarism was Napoleon Bonaparte, who admired and emulated Caesar during his rule in France. Napoleon III's policy under the Second French Empire, which combined an authoritarian regime and a proactive social policy, notably with the Ollivier law of 1864, can be described as a form of “social Caesarism”. According to historian , this policy aims in particular to rally the workers to the regime in the face of hostile liberal bosses.

Benjamin Disraeli was accused of Caesarism in March 1878 when, in anticipation of war with Russia, he mobilised British reserves and called Indian troops to Malta. G. K. Chesterton made one of the most ringing denunciations of Caesarism in his work Heretics, calling it "the worst form of slavery".

Sociologist Max Weber believed that every mass democracy went in a Caesarist direction. Professor of law Gerhard Casper writes, "Weber employed the term to stress, inter alia, the plebiscitary character of elections, disdain for parliament, the non-toleration of autonomous powers within the government and a failure to attract or suffer independent political minds."

20th century 
A so-called "democratic" form of Caesarism has been advocated by theorists like Venezuela's Laureano Vallenilla Lanz in Cesarismo Democrático (1919). Italian Duce Benito Mussolini and the ideology of Italian Fascism espoused Caesarism.

Antonio Gramsci stated that the roots of Caesarism lie at the level of a "crisis of authority" which is also a crisis of representation, that it occurs when social groups no longer identify with political parties which become anachronistic allowing a Caesarist solution to emerge. In the Italian case, Gramsci locates the causes of this socio-political disintegration in the destabilizing experience of the First World War, where the large peasant masses were forced to fight while they had been passive during the Risorgimento. Caesarism is a macro-social phenomenon and cannot be driven by the emergence of an individual, this phenomenon therefore fulfills a political function. Furthermore, Gramsci evokes the possibility of a “Caesarism without Caesar” but implemented by a group like the British National Government bringing together the Conservatives and Labour.

Oswald Spengler described Caeserism as a final phase of modernity that would succeed democracy.

21st century 
According to French historian Christian-Georges Schwentzel in the 21st century, Vladimir Putin and Recep Tayyip Erdoğan partly took over this Caesarean model by adapting it, responding at the same time to a desire for authority and grandeur emanating from their peoples.

See also 

 Bonapartism
 Caudillo
 Caesaropapism
 Cult of personality
 Italian Fascism
 Stratocracy
 Strongman (politics)
 Third Rome

References 

Julius Caesar
Political terminology